is a Japanese racewalker. He competed in the men's 20 kilometres walk at the 1964 Summer Olympics.

References

1942 births
Living people
Athletes (track and field) at the 1964 Summer Olympics
Japanese male racewalkers
Olympic athletes of Japan
Place of birth missing (living people)